Wagamama (stylised as wagamama) is a British restaurant chain, serving Asian food based on Japanese cuisine.

History
The first Wagamama was opened in 1992 in Bloomsbury, London, founded by Alan Yau, who subsequently created the Chinese restaurants Hakkasan and Yauatcha, and Thai restaurant Busaba Eathai. In June 2005, the restaurant's owner Graphite Capital sold the majority stake of 77.5% to Lion Capital LLP for £103million. In April 2011, the chain was sold to Duke Street Capital, for an estimated sum of £215million.

As of January 2014, the chain included over 190 restaurants, with 130 being in the United Kingdom. The chain was acquired for £559m by The Restaurant Group, owner of Frankie & Benny's & Chiquito in October 2018.

Other restaurants are located in Austria, Bahrain, Belgium, Bulgaria, Cyprus, Denmark, Gibraltar, Greece, Ireland, Italy, Malta, the Netherlands, Oman, Qatar, Slovakia, Spain, Sweden, Turkey, the UAE, and the United States. A new restaurant has opened at the beginning of 2019 in France.

Previous countries served by the Wagamama brand include Australia from 2002 to 2014, and New Zealand until 2019.

Wagamama has released two cookbooks in order to further extend its brand.

The first site on Streatham Street, Bloomsbury, London, closed permanently on 19 June 2016.

Brand
The word  is Japanese for "self-indulgent", "self-centred", "disobedient", or "wilful". Wagamama brands itself as following the process of kaizen.

News items

Environmental record
In November 2015, the chain was named by the Marine Conservation Society as one of seven restaurants surveyed that failed to meet a basic level of sustainability in its seafood. However, this was later retracted, as Wagamama revealed more information about the origin of its seafood.

Employment rights
In December 2017, Wagamama apologised after it was revealed some workers in Finchley were warned they would face disciplinary action if calling in sick over Christmas. The manager of the North Finchley branch asserted it was the responsibility of staff members, according to their contracts and handbook, to find somebody to cover their shifts. Wagamama said this was an isolated incident, not part of its employment policy.

Covid/quarantine losses
During the COVID-19 pandemic and subsequent quarantine, Wagamama parent company The Restaurant Group closed 250 restaurants, with a loss of nearly 4,500 jobs.

See also
 List of Japanese restaurants

References

External links

 Official UK website
 Official US website

1992 establishments in the United Kingdom
Asian restaurants in London
Chinese community in the United Kingdom
Japanese restaurants
Noodle restaurants
Restaurant groups in the United Kingdom
Restaurants established in 1992